Ajay (/ˈədʒɑɪ/) is a river which flows through the Indian states of Bihar, Jharkhand and West Bengal.

See also

List of rivers of India

References

 http://pib.nic.in/newsite/mbErel.aspx?relid=147477

Rivers of Bihar
Rivers of Jharkhand
Rivers of West Bengal
Rivers of India